David Cabrera Pujol (born 7 September 1989) is a Mexican professional footballer who plays as a midfielder.

Honours
UNAM
Mexican Primera División: Clausura 2009, Clausura 2011

Mexico U23
CONCACAF Olympic Qualifying Championship: 2012

References

External links
 
 

1989 births
Living people
Footballers from Mexico City
Association football midfielders
2009 CONCACAF U-20 Championship players
Club Universidad Nacional footballers
Atlético Morelia players
Liga MX players
Mexican footballers